The 2010–11 Omani League (known as the Oman Mobile League for sponsorship reasons) was the 35th edition of the top football league in Oman. It began on 1 November 2010 and finished on 30 April 2011. Al-Suwaiq Club were the defending champions, having won the previous 2009–10 Oman Mobile League season. On Saturday, 30 April 2011, Al-Suwaiq Club won 0–3 away in their final league match against Al-Nasr S.C.S.C. and emerged as the champions of the 2010–11 Oman Mobile League with a total of 43 points.

Teams
This season the league had 12 teams. Al-Khaboura SC and Al-Seeb Club were relegated to the Second Division League after finishing the relegation zone in the 2009–10 season. The two relegated teams were replaced by Second Division League winners Ahli Sidab Club (Group A) and Al-Hilal SC (Group B).

Stadia and locations

League table

Results

Promotion/relegation play-off

1st leg

2nd leg

Fanja secured promotion after winning by away goals rule (2-2).

Season statistics

Top scorers

Media coverage

See also
2010 Sultan Qaboos Cup
2010–11 Oman First Division League

References

Top level Omani football league seasons
1
Oman